The 1979 Campeonato Brasileiro Série A, (officially the V Copa Brasil) was the 23rd edition of the Campeonato Brasileiro Série A.

Overview

In the First phase, 80 clubs were divided into 8 groups of 10 clubs.in the groups A, B, C, D, E and F, the four first clubs qualified to the Second phase, while in the groups G and H, eight clubs qualified.

An edition of the Rio-São Paulo tournament was slated to happen in 1979 (it never came to fruition), and because of that, six clubs from Rio de Janeiro (Botafogo, Vasco da Gama, Goytacaz, Americano, Fluminense and Flamengo) and ten from São Paulo (Corinthians, Santos, Portuguesa, São Paulo, Francana, São Bento, XV de Piracicaba, XV de Jaú, Inter de Limeira and Comercial-SP) were to enter in the Second phase, joining the 40 teams that had qualified in the First phase. These teams would be divided in 7 groups of 8 teams, in which the two top-placed teams in each group qualified to the Third phase.

In the Third phase, the 14 qualified teams joined Guarani and Palmeiras, finalists of the previous year's championship, and were divided into four groups of four teams, in which the first-placed teams in each group qualified to the semifinals.

However, Corinthians, Portuguesa, Santos and São Paulo demanded to enter only in the third phase instead of the second. When CBD refused, the four teams withdrew from the championship. In order to replace them in the second phase, four berths were opened to the four best teams out of the 40 teams that had been eliminated in the first phase.

Internacional won the championship undefeated, becoming the only team to win the Campeonato Brasileiro Série A in this way.

First phase

Group A

Group B

Group C

Group D

Group E

Group F

Group G

Group H

Second phase

Group I

Group J
ABC withdrew from its last two matches against Grêmio Maringá and Figueirense

Group K

Group L

Group M

Group N

Group O

Third phase

Group P

Group R

Group S
Atlético Mineiro withdrew after the match against Cruzeiro, that ended in a 0-0 draw, and the points of the remaining matches were awarded to Goiás and Internacional.

Group T

Semifinals

First leg

Second leg

Finals

First leg

Second leg

Final standings

References
 1979 Campeonato Brasileiro Série A at RSSSF

1979
1
Brazil
B